Leni is both a given name and a surname. Notable people with the name include:

Given name
Male and female:
Leni Alexander (1924–2005), Chilean composer
Leni Apisai (born 1996), New Zealand rugby union player
Leni Björklund (born 1944), Swedish politician
Leni Harper (born 1954), Scottish actress
Leni Junker (1905–1997), German runner
Leni Kokkes-Hanepen (born 1934), Dutch fencer
Leni Larsen Kaurin (born 1981), Norwegian footballer
Leni Lohmar (1914–2006), German swimmer
Leni Lynn (1923–2010), American actress
Leni Parker (born 1966), Canadian actress
Leni Riefenstahl (1902–2003), German director
Leni Robredo (born 1965), 14th Vice President of the Philippines and founder of the Angat Buhay non-government organization
Leni Schmidt (1906–1985), German athlete
Leni Shida (born 1994), Ugandan sprinter
Leni Sinclair (born 1940), American photographer
Leni Stengel (1901–1982), American actress
Leni Stern (born 1952), German musician
Leni Yahil (1912–2007), Israeli historian
Leni Zumas, American novelist
Tamaseu Leni Warren, Samoan swimmer

Surname
Nollen Cornelius Leni, Solomon Islander politician
Paul Leni (1885–1929), German director

Fictional
Leni Loud, a character in the American animated series, The Loud House.
Leni McClearly, identical twin sister of Gina McClearly in the 2022 Netflix miniseries Echoes

Feminine given names